Eric Wolford is an American football coach and former player. He is currently the offensive line coach at the University of Alabama. Wolford previously served as the offensive line coach at the University of Kentucky in 2021. He was the head football coach at Youngstown State University from 2010 to 2014. After a 3–8 mark in his first season, the Penguins compiled a 28–18 mark over his final four campaigns, were ranked in the top-10 three times, and broke 32 school records during his tenure. Highlights included a 2012 win over 2012 Pittsburgh Panthers football team—the first win over a BCS team in school history, and a 2011 win over top-ranked North Dakota State.

Alabama 
On February 1, 2022, It was reported that Eric Wolford has accepted the position of Offensive Line Coach at Alabama.

Head coaching record

References

External links
 Youngstown State profile

1971 births
Living people
Arizona Wildcats football coaches
Emporia State Hornets football coaches
Houston Cougars football coaches
Illinois Fighting Illini football coaches
Kansas State Wildcats football coaches
Kansas State Wildcats football players
Kentucky Wildcats football coaches
North Texas Mean Green football coaches
San Francisco 49ers coaches
South Carolina Gamecocks football coaches
South Florida Bulls football coaches
Youngstown State Penguins football coaches